The Council of Foreign Ministers (CFM ; ; ; DBK), formerly known as Islamic Conference of Foreign Ministers, is the main decision-making body of the Organisation of Islamic Cooperation consisting one representative from each member states of the OIC. It is the largest decision-oriented intergovernmental organization that holds conferences every year called Islamic Summit pertaining to the issues concerning Muslim nations and the OIC's agenda. The 48th summit is scheduled to be held in Islamabad, Pakistan on 22 March 2022.

It hold meetings objectively focused on the implementation of decisions and recommendations within the scope of OIC principles and guidelines. One of its main activities are to approve budget of the General Secretariat and its other departments. It also elect chief executive officer for the post of secretary general. The Republic of Turkey has hosted three Islamic Summits between 1976, which was its first meeting (7th DBK) and the second in 1991 (12th DBK), while the third and the last summit hosted in Turkey was held in 2004 during the 31st DBK.

Beside being a part of council of foreign affairs ministers, it also hosts public conferences called Extraordinary Foreign Ministers Meeting designed to address the human rights violations in the Muslim nations, including in Afghanistan.

Powers and duties 
The Council of Foreign Ministers is mandated with the sole authority to take critical decisions regarding the activities and purpose of the OIC. It is also responsible for changing the status of the OIC and its associated members within the scope of the organisational principles. The foreign ministers of the member states, including the host country, Turkey plays a vital role in the OIC. They are entitled to propose any critical change within the it's guidelines and scope, while are itself implemented by the Council of Foreign Ministers. It also establish trust funds for humanitarian aid in the state of emergencies.

It implements general policies, in addition to adopting decisions and resolutions pertaining to the common interest of the OIC. Once a decision is taken, it reviews progress for its final approval and implementation of decisions and resolutions. The council submits its final result to the General Secretariat for its final approval which is traditionally headed by OIC's general secretary. Affiliated organs specialized in common interest of the general policies also participates in parliamentary procedure which is officially known by the OIC as session or Islamic summit.

List of sessions 
The first session was hosted on 3 September 1969 by the Kingdom of Morocco in Rabat, while the last summit was hosted between 22 and 23 March 2022 by the Islamic Republic of Pakistan in Islamabad.

As of 2022, Bangladesh, Guinea, Libya, Malaysia, Niger and Yemen have hosted the summit twice. Turkey 3 times, Morocco 4 times, Pakistan and Saudi Arabia 5 times.

References 

Organisation of Islamic Cooperation
Organizations established in 1969
Intergovernmental organizations